Oleg Borisovich Yakovlev (born 16 June 1997) is a Russian football player. He plays for FC Elektron Veliky Novgorod.

Club career
He made his debut in the Russian Football National League for FC Dynamo Saint Petersburg on 18 March 2015 in a game against FC Baltika Kaliningrad.

References

External links
 Profile by Russian Football National League

1997 births
Living people
Russian footballers
Association football defenders
FC Dynamo Saint Petersburg players
Russian First League players
Russian Second League players